Michail Elgin and Alexandre Kudryavtsev defeated Sanchai Ratiwatana and Sonchat Ratiwatana 7–6(3), 6–3 in the final.

Seeds

Draw

Draw

References
 Main Draw

ATP Challenger Guangzhou - Doubles
China International Guangzhou